Lutz Hill is a hill rising to about   southeast of The Tooth in the Kyle Hills of Ross Island, Antarctica. It was named by the Advisory Committee on Antarctic Names in 2000 after electrical engineer Larry F. Lutz of the Institute for Physical Science and Technology, University of Maryland, a specialist in the development of scientific research instrumentation for ground-based, balloon, and rocket sounding programs for the United States Antarctic Program. Lutz spent 17 summer seasons at McMurdo Station, South Pole Station, and Siple Station in the years 1980–2000.

References

Hills of Ross Island